Umm Assa'd bint Isam al-Himyari (died 1243) was a Muslim Arabic poet.

Umm Assa'd, also known as Sa'duna, was from Cordova. Her poem 'I will kiss' has been translated into English, and is included in a modern bilingual anthology of classical poetry by Arab women.

References

Year of birth unknown
1243 deaths
13th-century Arabic poets
Women poets from al-Andalus
Arabic-language women poets
Arabic-language poets
13th-century writers from al-Andalus